Phantasmarana massarti is a species of frog in the family Hylodidae.
It is endemic to Brazil.
Its natural habitats are subtropical or tropical moist lowland forest and rivers.

It was formerly placed in the genus Megaelosia, but was reclassified to Phantasmarana in 2021.

References

Phantasmarana
Endemic fauna of Brazil
Amphibians of Brazil
Taxonomy articles created by Polbot
Amphibians described in 1930